Official road traffic accident statistics in the Republic of Ireland are compiled by the Road Safety Authority (RSA) using data supplied by the Garda Síochána (police). While related data is collected by other organisations, including the National Roads Authority, local authorities, and the Health Service Executive, these are not factored into RSA statistics.

Footnotes

References

Sources

Citations

Road traffic accidents by year
Ireland, Republic